Alexander Deilert (born February 10, 1989) is a Swedish professional ice hockey defenceman. He is currently playing for AIK in the HockeyAllsvenskan (Allsv).

Playing career
Deilert previously played for AIK IF in the HockeyAllsvenskan, Karlskrona HK of the Swedish Hockey League (SHL). and Djurgårdens in the Elitserien during the 2008–09 season. He was drafted by the Calgary Flames in the seventh round of the 2008 NHL Entry Draft, 198th overall.

Career statistics

References

External links 

1989 births
Living people
AIK IF players
Almtuna IS players
Asplöven HC players
IF Björklöven players
Bofors IK players
Calgary Flames draft picks
Djurgårdens IF Hockey players
Frisk Asker Ishockey players
Karlskrona HK players
Leksands IF players
Mora IK players
SC Riessersee players
IF Sundsvall Hockey players
Swedish ice hockey defencemen
Örebro HK players
Ice hockey people from Stockholm